The Istanbul Naval Museum (Turkish: İstanbul Deniz Müzesi) is a national naval museum, located in the Beşiktaş district of Istanbul, Turkey. It was established in 1897 by the Ottoman Minister of the Navy (Bahriye Nazırı) Bozcaadalı Hasan Hüsnü Pasha.

The museum contains an important collection of military artifacts pertaining to the Ottoman Navy. In the maritime field, it is Turkey's largest museum, with a great variety of collections. Around 20,000 pieces are present in its collection, including the late 16th or early 17th century Ottoman galley known as Tarihi Kadırga, built in the period between the reigns of Sultan Murad III (1574–1595) and Sultan Mehmed IV (1648–1687), as evidenced by AMS radiocarbon dating and dendrochronological research. She is the only surviving original galley in the world, and has the world's oldest continuously maintained wooden hull.

Being connected to the Turkish Naval Forces Command, it is also the country's first military museum.

In the early 21st century a new exhibition building was constructed. The construction began in 2008, and the building was reopened on October 4, 2013. It has two floors above ground level and one basement floor, all covering .

The basement consists of diverse items like figureheads, ornaments of naval ships, ship models, and pieces of the Byzantine chain that was used for blocking the entrance of the Golden Horn during the Ottoman conquest of Constantinople (Istanbul) in 1453. In the first and second floors, a large number of imperial and other caïques are exhibited.

Many exhibition items underwent special restoration and conservation works due to deformation of the raw materials caused by heat, light, humidity, atmospheric conditions, vandalism and other factors.

Access

The museum is located on Hayrettin İskelesi Street in Beşiktaş, Istanbul, near the Beşiktaş ferry pier for the Beşiktaş-Kadıköy line. The museum is open every day between 09:00 and 17:00, except for Mondays, New Year's Day and the first day of religious holidays.

See also
 List of museums and monuments in Istanbul

Notes

External links

Photos of the Istanbul Naval Museum
Working link to 120 pictures

Museums in Istanbul
National museums in Turkey
Naval museums
Museums established in 1897
Military and war museums in Turkey
Beşiktaş
1897 establishments in the Ottoman Empire
Bosphorus
Naval museums in Turkey